The Chicago Sports Museum is a 23,000-square-foot museum located along the Magnificent Mile at the Water Tower Place mall in Chicago. The museum, which was opened on April 1, 2014—by Harry Caray's Restaurant Group and CEO Grant DePorter—features interactive skill challenges, unique sports memorabilia, and a collection of game-used artifacts well known to fans of Chicago sports.

References

External links
 

Mus
Museums in Chicago
Sports museums in Illinois
Museums established in 2014
2014 establishments in Illinois